Woldingham railway station is on the Oxted line in the west of the civil parish and village of Woldingham in Surrey, England. The station is managed by Southern.

History
The station opened as Marden Park in 1885, one year after the line opened, with one waiting shelter and named after the manor in the west of Woldingham and north-east of Godstone. The line was relatively late in the history of the railways due to the amount of earth-moving and chalk extraction required. It was renamed Woldingham in 1894.

The station appears briefly in the 1973 David Jason film White Cargo, at the 27:00 minute mark.

Facilities
On the southbound platform, there is a self-service ticket machine and a ticket office which is staffed during weekday and Saturday mornings only. The ticket office also contains a waiting room and toilets which are open when the station is staffed. Both platforms have shelters, information screens and modern help points. The station has a chargeable car park and bicycle storage is available at the station.

Services
Off-peak, all services at Woldingham are operated by Southern using  EMUs.

The typical off-peak service in trains per hour is:
 1 tph to 
 1 tph to  via 

During the peak hours and on weekends, the service is increased to 2 tph in each direction.

These services are operated using  EMUs.

References

External links 

Railway stations in Surrey
Former Croydon and Oxted Joint Railway stations
Railway stations in Great Britain opened in 1885
Railway stations served by Govia Thameslink Railway